Carex xiphium is a species of sedge in the family Cyperaceae, native to the Russian Far East, Manchuria, and the Korean Peninsula. Its chromosome number is 2n=56.

References

xiphium
Flora of Amur Oblast
Flora of Khabarovsk Krai
Flora of Primorsky Krai
Flora of Manchuria
Flora of Korea
Plants described in 1901